Spectrum award may refer to:

Spectrum Foundation Awards, awarded to architects and their works
Gaylactic Spectrum Awards, awarded to literary works that portray LGBT issues in a positive way
 Spectrum Award, awarded to works of contemporary fantastic art